The following is a list of ambassadors of the United States, or other Chiefs of Mission, to Belize. The title given by the United States State Department to this position is currently Ambassador Extraordinary and Minister Plenipotentiary.

See also
Belize–United States relations
Foreign relations of Belize
Ambassadors of the United States

References

Citations

Sources 

 
 United States Department of State: Background notes on Belize

External links
 United States Department of State: Chiefs of Mission for Belize
 United States Department of State: Belize
 United States Embassy in Belmopan

Belize
Main
United States